Vålerenga Ishockey (abbreviated as VIF) is a Norwegian ice hockey team based in Oslo, Norway. Vålerenga has been the dominant force in Norwegian hockey since the 1960s, claiming 26 national championships and 29 regular season titles. Their old home arena, located in central-eastern Oslo, was Jordal Amfi, built for the 1952 Winter Olympics. In 2020, Vålerenga moved in to their new arena at Jordal.

The team's interim head coach is former NHL player and club legend, Espen "Shampo" Knutsen, with Joachim Svendsen his assistant.

History

Early days 

Although the parent club Vålerengens Idrettsforening was founded in 1913, the history of Vålerenga Ishockey starts in 1947, when the junior team participated in the national junior championships for the first time. In the 50s, the junior team won the national junior championships five years in a row.

First dynasty (1960–1973) 

Vålerenga won their first national championship in 1960, taking over the throne from local rivals Gamlebyen. More championships were won in 1962 and 1963. From 1965 to 1971, Vålerenga won the championship an incredible seven times in a row, a feat not repeated in Norwegian hockey since. Notable players from this era include Arne "Mikkel" Mikkelsen, Steinar "Bjølle" Bjølbak, Tor "Jern-Gustav" Gundersen, and notably, Roy "Sleipern" Jansen. Another title was added in 1973, but this also marked the end of the first dynasty as the club faced a generational change.

A new generation (1982–1994) 

Ten years went by before Vålerenga could celebrate another championship, in 1983. A new generation had emerged, and players such as Jim Marthinsen, Roy Johansen, Geir Myhre, Tor Helge "Totto" Eikeland, Bjørn Kolsrud, Arne Billkvam and Jon Magne Karlstad would go on to become club legends. In 1988, Vålerenga won their 15th title. The next season saw the debut of Espen Knutsen, who would later become the first Vålerenga product to play in the National Hockey League.

Recent era 

This marked the start of another dynasty for Vålerenga and the club added several more titles in the 1990s. Kent Forsberg became head coach in 1994 and invited his son Peter and Markus Näslund to play a friendly match for the club during the lockout season in the NHL. The 20th national championship was won in 1999. Notable players from this era include Morten Ask, Kenneth Larsen, and Kjell Richard "Ricky" Nygaard, along with Swedish imports such as Johan Brummer, Patric Englund and Niklas Gällstedt. Six more championships were added after 2000, the last being won in 2009. Vålerenga were in talks to join the Kontinental Hockey League in 2014, but the plans didn't go through.

Vålerenga's home arena through six decades, Jordal Amfi, was demolished in January 2017 and to be replaced by a new arena, projected to be completed in 2019.

Season-by-season results 
This is a partial list of the last five seasons completed by Vålerenga. For the full season-by-season history, see List of Vålerenga Ishockey seasons.

Head coaches 

 Jan Molberg, ?-1953 
 Georg Hebæk, 1953-? 
 Tor Gundersen, 195?-197?
 Lennart Johansson, 1983-1984 
 Lennart Åhlberg, 1984-1987
 Erik Ask, 1987-1990
 Geir Myhre, 1990-1993
 Kent Forsberg, 1994-1995
 Staffan Tholson, 1995-1997
 Roy Johansen, 1997-2001
 Petter Thoresen, 2001-2004
 Knut Jørgen Stubdal, 2004-2006
 Espen Knutsen, 2006-2016
 Roy Johansen, 2016-

Honours 
 Norwegian Champions (26):  1960, 1962–3, 1965–71, 1973, 1982, 1985, 1987–8, 1991–3, 1998–9, 2001, 2003, 2005–7, 2009
 Regular Seasons (30): 1961–62, 1962–63, 1963–64, 1964–65, 1965–66, 1966–67, 1967–68, 1968–69, 1969–70, 1970–71, 1979–80, 1981–82, 1984–85, 1987–88, 1990–91, 1991–92, 1992–93, 1993–94, 1995–96, 1997–98, 1998–1999, 1999–00, 2001–02, 2002–03, 2004–05, 2006–07, 2009–10, 2012–13, 2013–14, 2018–19

Individual all-time records 

Statistics for regular season only.
  – current active player

Scoring leaders

Most league matches 

Last updated: 25 May 2018

Notable players 

  Alexander Bonsaksen
  Anders Fredriksen
  Anders Myrvold
  Arne Billkvam
  Atle Olsen
  Björn Bjurling
  Blake Evans
  Brede Frettem Csiszar
  Brendan Brooks
  Brian Ihnacak
  Bård Sørlie
  Chris Mason
  Christian Chartier
  Daniel Sørvik
  Einar Bruno Larsen
  Erik Follestad Johansen
  Espen "Shampo" Knutsen
  Evan Cheverie
  Frank Vestreng
  Gavin Morgan
  Geir Hoff
  Geir Myhre
  Greg Day
  Ilkka Kaarna
  Jan-Roar Fagerli
  Jim Marthinsen
  Jiri Latal
  Johan Åkerman
  Johan Brummer
  Jon-Magne Karlstad
  Justin Donati
  Jørgen Karterud
  Ken Andre Olimb
  Kent Nilsson
  Lars Erik Lund
  Lars Haugen
  Marius Rath
  Mark McCutcheon
  Martin Laumann Ylven
  Mathis Olimb
  Mathias Trygg
  Mats Rosseli Olsen
  Mats Trygg
  Mats Zuccarello
  Morten Ask
  Sigurd Thinn
  Tommy Marthinsen
  Travis Brigley
  Per-Ragnar Bergkvist
  Petter Thoresen
  Patric Englund
  Patrick Coulombe
  Patrick DesRochers
  Regan Kelly
  Roy Jansen
  Roy Johansen
  Scott Hartnell
  Serge Boisvert
  Sergei Pushkov
  Simon Gamache
  Sondre Olden
  Stig Johansen
  Tommy Kiviaho
  Tyler Donati
  Vegar Barlie
  Vladimir Machulda
  Øystein Olsen

References

External links
 Official website
 "Klanen",  the organized Vålerenga Supporters Club
 "101%", an online fanzine
 Updated team rosters

 
Ice hockey teams in Norway
Ice hockey clubs established in 1913
1913 establishments in Norway
GET-ligaen teams
Sport in Oslo
Kontinental Hockey League expansion teams